A constitutional referendum was held in Estonia between 10 and 12 June 1933. The new constitution proposed by Parliament was rejected by 67.3% of voters, with a turnout of 66.5%.

Results

References

1933
1933 referendums
1933 in Estonia
Constitutional referendums in Estonia